Savaloy Dip is an album recorded in 1974 by singer songwriter Alan Price. Despite being recorded in 1974 and intended to be a sequel to O Lucky Man!, it was only released in 2016.

It was recorded for Reprise Records as a full-length album, clearly intended for official release, but was recalled by the company after being accidentally issued on 8-track.

Before it was recalled, a limited number of copies were sold, which are now very rare.

It was intended to be a sequel to O Lucky Man!, but due to it being recalled, the album was dropped and Price moved on to record Between Today and Yesterday, with its title track originally having been written for Savaloy Dip.

In 2016 it was released by Omnivore Recordings.

Track listing
All songs written by Alan Price, except where indicated.

"Smells Like Lemon, Tastes Like Wine" – 4:34
"Willie the Queen" – 3:13
"You Won't Get Me" – 4:03
"Poor Jimmy" – 4:16
"Savaloy Dip" – 4:04
"Keep On Doin’ It" – 2:37
"Country Life" – 2:32
"Passin’ Us By" – 2:24
"Over and Over Again" (Kenny Craddock) – 4:21
"And So Goodbye" – 3:57
"Between Today and Yesterday" – 3:49

Personnel

Musicians
 Alan Price – vocals, piano, organ, bass
 Hughie Flint, Alan White, Craig Collinge – drums
 Pete Kirtley – guitar
 John Mumford – bass, trombone
 Jeff Condon – trumpet
 Steve Gregory, Stan Sulzmann – tenor saxophone

Technical
 Alan Price – producer
 Ed Thrasher – art direction
 John Haynes – photography
 Gene Sculatti – liner notes
 Dusty Springfield – quotation author
 Brad Rosenberger, Cheryl Pawelski – reissue producer
 Greg Allen – reissue art direction
 Reuben Cohen, Gavin Lurssen – reissue mastering

References

1974 albums
2016 albums
Alan Price albums
Reprise Records albums
Omnivore Recordings albums